The Texan is a 1930 American Western film directed by John Cromwell and starring Gary Cooper and Fay Wray. Based on the short story "The Double-Dyed Deceiver" by O. Henry, the film is about a daring bandit called the Llano Kid who shoots a young gambler in self-defense and is forced to hide from the law. He is helped by a corrupt lawyer who involves the bandit in a scheme to swindle a Mexican aristocrat whose son turns out to be the young gambler killed by the Llano Kid. The screenplay was written by Daniel Nathan Rubin, and the story was adapted for the screen by Oliver H.P. Garrett and Victor Milner. Produced by Hector Turnbull for Paramount Pictures, The Texan was released in the United States on May 10, 1930. The film received positive reviews upon its theatrical release.

Plot
A young bandit called the Llano Kid (Gary Cooper) is wanted by the law and has a price on his head. After stopping in at the local blacksmith, John Brown (James A. Marcus), a highly religious man who fancies himself a sheriff, the Kid gets into a poker game during which he notices a young gambler cheating, confronts him, and is forced to kill him in self-defense. The Kid is then pursued by Sheriff Brown and is almost apprehended, but is able to get the draw on the zealous lawman. As the Kid leaps into the saddle, Sheriff Brown pledges, "God will deliver you into my hands."

Later aboard a train, the Kid meets an unscrupulous lawyer named Thacker (Oscar Apfel), who convinces him to pose as the son of Señora Ibarra (Emma Dunn), a wealthy South American widow whose son Enrique disappeared 15 years earlier. Having set himself up as the widow's agent hired to find the lost son, Thacker plans to return with her "son" and swindle the widow's gold in the process. Soon, the two men set sail aboard a schooner to South America, where they arrive at Señora Ibarra's family hacienda in a little seaport town of Buenas Tierras. With his basic Spanish-speaking skills, new sideburns, and tattooed hand (similar to Enriques), the Kid is able to pass himself off as Enrique, the long-lost son of Señora Ibarra's.

Their plans are interrupted, however, when the Kid meets and falls in love with his lovely "niece" Consuelo (Fay Wray). Softened by Señora Ibarra's affection for him, and his newfound love, he begins to have second doubts about the scheme. When the Kid learns that Señora Ibarra's son was, in fact, the very man he shot in self-defense in the saloon, he calls off his deal with Thacker. Angered by this turn of events, Thacker organizes a gang to steal the gold outright.

Meanwhile, Sheriff Brown arrives at Buenas Tierras, having finally tracked down the Llano Kid, who has been "delivered into his hands". He waits until nightfall before making the arrest. During the ensuing gunfight, the Kid is wounded, and Thacker is killed. Afterwards, Brown has a change of heart after seeing the Kid's true character and courage. The sheriff agrees to keep the Kid's identity secret so Enrique can continue his life with his new family.

Cast

 Gary Cooper as The Llano Kid 
 Fay Wray as Consuelo
 Emma Dunn as Señora Doña Marguerita Ibarra
 Oscar Apfel as Thacker
 James A. Marcus as Sheriff John Brown
 Donald Reed as Nick Ibarra
 Soledad Jiménez as The Dueña
 Veda Buckland as Mary, a Nurse 
 César Vanoni as Pasquale
 Ed Brady as Henry
 Enrique Acosta as Sixto
 Romualdo Tirado as Cabman

Production
The Texan is based on the short story "The Double-Dyed Deceiver" by O. Henry, which was first published in  Everybody's Magazine in December 1905. The story was previously filmed as A Double-Dyed Deceiver (1920) with Jack Pickford in the lead role. 
The railroad scenes were filmed on the Sierra Railroad in Tuolumne County, California.

Critical response
In his review for The New York Times, Mordaunt Hall called the film "an expertly touched-up audible pictorial adaptation of O. Henry's story". Hall praises Cooper for his "capital acting", comparing his performance to his earlier success, The Virginian. "The lean, lanky Mr. Cooper elicits a great deal of sympathy as the double-dyed deceiver," Hall observes. He also acknowledges the supporting performances by screen veterans Oscar Apfel, the "splendid" James Marcus, the "pleasing" Emma Dunn, and Fay Wray, who "has never been more captivating than she is as Consuelo". Hall gives most of the credit for the film's success to director John Cromwell and screenwriter Oliver H. P. Garrett, who are able to balance the irony of O'Henry's original story with a love interest that is "adroitly introduced without hindering the dénouement".

References

External links
 
 
 

1930 films
American black-and-white films
1930 Western (genre) films
1930s English-language films
Paramount Pictures films
Adaptations of works by O. Henry
American Western (genre) films
1930s American films